The 12241 / 12242 Chandigarh–Amritsar Superfast Express is a Superfast Express express train belonging to Indian Railways – Northern Railway zone that runs between  and  in India.

It operates as train number 12242 from Amritsar Junction to Chandigarh and as train number 12241 in the reverse direction, serving the Union Territory of Chandigarh & the state of Punjab.

Coaches

The 12242 / 41 Amritsar–Chandigarh Superfast Express has 1 AC Chair Car, 7 Second Class seating, 2 General Unreserved, 1 End on Generator & 1 SLR (Seating cum Luggage Rake) coaches. It does not carry a pantry car.

As is customary with most train services in India, coach composition may be amended at the discretion of Indian Railways depending on demand.

Service

The 12242 Amritsar–Chandigarh Superfast Express covers the distance of 248 kilometres in 3 hours 55 mins (63.32 km/hr) & in 4 hours 00 mins as 12241 Chandigarh–Amritsar Superfast Express (62.00 km/hr).

As the average speed of the train is above , as per Indian Railways rules, its fare includes a Superfast surcharge.

Routeing

Traction

As the entire route is fully electrified, a Ghaziabad-based WAP-5 / WAP-7 locomotive powers the train for its entire journey.

Timings

12242 Amritsar–Chandigarh Superfast Express leaves Amritsar Junction on a daily basis at 05:15 hrs IST and reaches Chandigarh at 09:10 hrs IST the same day.
12241 Chandigarh–Amritsar Superfast Express leaves Chandigarh on a daily basis at 17:25 hrs IST and reaches Amritsar Junction at 21:25 hrs IST the same day.

References 

 https://web.archive.org/web/20140714152953/http://www.hindustantimes.com/punjab/amritsar/amritsar-chandigarh-duronto-to-make-way-for-superfast/article1-924532.aspx
 http://archive.indianexpress.com/news/new-chandigarhamritsar-train-to-chug-off-on-nov-15/1193858/
 
 http://timesofindia.indiatimes.com/city/chandigarh/Superfast-train-from-Chandigarh-to-Amritsar/articleshow/16245019.cms
 https://www.youtube.com/watch?v=AH3rhCFzX4c
 http://www.tribuneindia.com/2012/20120912/main8.htm
 http://railroadair.blogspot.in/2013/04/chandigarh-amritsar-superfast-express.html

External links

Express trains in India
Rail transport in Punjab, India
Transport in Amritsar
Rail transport in Chandigarh